Emeline K/Bidi (born 13 May 1987) is a French lawyer and politician who was elected to represent Réunion's 4th constituency in the 2022 legislative election.

Biography 
K/Bidi was born on 13 May 1987 in Saint-Denis, Réunion, and studied law. On 5 April 2013 was sworn in at the high court of Saint-Denis where she worked as an associate lawyer. In 2018, she was called to the bar at Saint-Pierre.

2022 National Assembly election 
In the 2022 National Assembly election, K/Bidi ran to represent Réunion's 4th constituency. She ran as a candidate of Le Progrès. In the second round on 19 June 2022, K/Bidi defeated Lorion with 61% of the vote.

References 

Living people
1987 births
21st-century French politicians
21st-century French women politicians
Members of the National Assembly (France)
Deputies of the 16th National Assembly of the French Fifth Republic
People from Saint-Denis, Réunion
Politicians of Réunion
Women from Réunion in politics
21st-century French women lawyers